Andrés Anwandter (born 1974, in Valdivia, Chile) is a Chilean poet, known for his sound poetry.

He studied psychology at the Pontifical Catholic University of Chile, and still works in the field. He was an instructor at the Spanish-American poetry workshop led by Jorge Gissi at the same university, and edited the magazine Humo ("Smoke"), along with Alejandro Zambra. In 1993 he received a scholarship from the Neruda Foundation and in 1995 won first prize in the Feuc Poetry Contest. In 2002 he was awarded the Municipal Prize for Poetry for Especies Intencionales, his second book.

Works
 El árbol del lenguaje en otoño. Santiago: DAEX, 1996.
 Especies Intencionales. Santiago: Quid Ediciones, 2001.
 Square Poems. London: Writers Forum Press, 2002.
 Banda Sonora. Santiago: Ediciones La Calabaza del Diablo, 2006.

External links
 Poems
 Poems and articles
 Short biography and audio

Chilean male poets
Living people
1974 births
People from Valdivia
Pontifical Catholic University of Chile alumni
20th-century Chilean poets
20th-century Chilean male writers
21st-century Chilean poets
21st-century Chilean male writers